The Patrick Burn Formation is a geologic formation in Scotland. This formation is main part of fossil site called as Birk Knowes. It preserves fossils dating back to the Silurian period.

Description 
This formation contains fossils from non-marine or marginal marine environment. Site is closed by Scottish government agency Scottish Natural Heritage (now NatureScot), due to fossil robbery by amateur collector.

Paleobiota

Arthropods

Chordates

See also

 List of fossiliferous stratigraphic units in Scotland

References
 

Geologic formations of Scotland
Silurian System of Europe
Silurian Scotland
Silurian southern paleotropical deposits